Cassidy of Bar 20 is a 1938 American Western film directed by Lesley Selander and written by Norman Houston. The film stars William Boyd, Russell Hayden, Frank Darien, Nora Lane, Robert Fiske and John Elliott. The film was released on February 25, 1938, by Paramount Pictures.

Plot

When bad-guys begin harassing the townsfolk, Hoppy's (William Boyd) former gal Nora Blake (Nora Lane) sends him a plea for help. Hoppy is the boss of Bar 20 ranch in Texas, so he rides down the Camino Real in the New Mexico cattle country near Alamogordo.

Before he and his saddlemates, "Lucky" Jenkins (Russell Hayden) and "Pappy (Frank Darien), can reach her ranch, they are stopped by Clay Allison (Robert Fiske), a cattle-rustler who is in almost complete control of the district, and wants to extend his holdings by seizing Nora's cattle and driving her out.

Shortly before the final shoot-out the good-guys are having dinner. When the shooting begins, Pappy hurries to finish his meal before joining in the mayhem.

Cast
 William Boyd as Hopalong Cassidy
 Russell Hayden as Lucky Jenkins
 Frank Darien as Pappy
 Nora Lane as Nora Blake
 Robert Fiske as Clay Allison
 John Elliott as Tom Dillon
 Margaret Marquis as Mary Dillon
 Gertrude Hoffman as Ma Caffrey 
 Carleton Young as Jeff Caffrey
 Gordon Hart as Judge Belcher
 Ed Cassidy as Sheriff Hawley

References

External links 
 
 
 
 

1938 films
American black-and-white films
American Western (genre) films
1938 Western (genre) films
Paramount Pictures films
Films directed by Lesley Selander
Hopalong Cassidy films
1930s English-language films
1930s American films